VA-16 or VA 16 may refer to:

 VA-16 (U.S. Navy), a U.S. Navy Attack Squadron active from 1955 to 1958
 Virginia's 16th congressional district, an obsolete U.S. congressional district 
 Virginia State Route 16, a state highway
 State Route 16 (Virginia 1918-1940), a former state highway